Bootle High School was located in Netherton, Merseyside, England. The school throughout its history was based across several sites, until it ultimately closed in 2009 following amalgamation with a newly built Litherland High School. The school is notable as being the first in Britain to install an Amstrad computer network which facilitated learning and communication between the school's then split sites.

History

Grammar School
Bootle High School started as Bootle Grammar School For Boys, based at Balliol Road, Bootle (where the modern day Hugh Baird resides) until 1961, when it moved to a new site at Marian Way in Netherton.

Comprehensive
In 1973, Warwick Bolam Secondary School merged with Bootle Grammar School to become Warwick Bolam High School. The school resided on two sites until 1984 when Warwick Bolam High School merged with The Countess of Derby based at Browns Lane. The name was then changed to Bootle High School with the headmaster of Warwick Bolam High School (Mr Middleton) retaining his position of headmaster, whilst the headmaster of Countess of Derby (Mr Gratton) becoming deputy headmaster of the merged school.

In 1986, the 1,100 pupil school became notable for being the first in the country to have an Amstrad computer network installed, which began installation in 1985 and officially launched in September. The costs were shared between the school and Sefton Council. There was international interest in the system, provided by Northern Computers, with requests from countries such as Australia, New Zealand and Iceland, among others. As well as offering word processing and computing courses, it also facilitated data transfer between the school's split sites and could be used as an electronic mail system. Headteacher Peter Middleton planned to introduce computers to every student at the school with the aim for "every child to be computer literate".

For two years, the school was based on three sites until 1986, when the council decided to use the Glovers Lane site to build a community centre, now known as the Netherton Activity Centre.  The school was back to two sites again until 1991, at which point the entire school moved to a single site in Browns Lane after spending over 3 million pounds on improving and extending the building.

Ofsted inspections
During the 2005 Ofsted inspection, the school's overall effectiveness was judged to be satisfactory, deemed to be an improvement on previous years. Shortly before closure, the school was re-inspected by OFSTED with a determination of good.

Litherland High School merger proposal
The Liverpool Echo newspaper reported in October 2006 that Sefton Council had been awarded government funding to build a new school, which would merge Bootle High School into Litherland High School, mainly due to falling intake numbers particularly at Bootle High School, with proposals for a Sixth form to be constructed on the site of Bootle High School. Objection were initially raised with regards to the closure of Bootle High School, despite indications that the DfES had approved the council's plan. 1984 – 2009

A meeting held at the Town Hall, Bootle in May 2007 indicated the project would cost approximately £22.4m, with the new higher capacity Litherland High School operating from 1 September 2009. All pupils at Bootle High School were assigned to the new Litherland High School in 2009.

Notable former pupils

Bootle Grammar School
 Walter Anderson, General Secretary from 1957 to 1973 of NALGO 
 George Davies, clothes designer and creator of George at Asda in 1990 and Next plc in 1981
 Alan Grey OBE, Ambassador to Gabon from 1982 to 1984
 Very Rev Rudolph Henderson Howat, Diocese of Brechin from 1957 to 1964
 Graham Karran, Chief Fire Officer from 1980 to 1983 of Derbyshire Fire Service and from 1983 to 1990 of West Yorkshire Fire Service
 Gordon Redding
 Alan Simpson, Labour MP from 1992 to 2010 for Nottingham South, President of the Student Union from 1969 to 1970 of Trent Polytechnic
 Matt Simpson (poet)
 Hugh O'Hanlon, worked at CERN in Switzerland, part of the nuclear engineering development team of the Hadron Collider.
 Sir Kenneth Thompson, 1st Baronet, Conservative MP from 1950 to 1964 for Liverpool Walton, and chairman from 1977 to 1981 of Merseyside County Council
 Prof Dr Ing Frank Walsh, professor in Electrochemical Engineering at several UK and overseas universities, 1990–2020, including Southampton; Head of Chemical Engineering at Bath University; Head of Chemistry, Physics & Radiography at Portsmouth University; Director of Business Development at Portsmouth University; Director of Research Institute for Industry, Southampton University. Emeritus Professor of Electrochemical Engineering, University of Southampton, 2020-.
 Edward James Forshaw CEO of Ashtead 1992-2002

References

External links
 School Website
 EduBase

Educational institutions disestablished in 2009
Defunct schools in the Metropolitan Borough of Sefton
2009 disestablishments in England